Ladies and Gentlemen is a play by Charles MacArthur and Ben Hecht. The courtroom drama, inspired by a Hungarian play Twelve in a Box by Leslie Bush-Fekete, centers on the relationship that develops between two sequestered jurors, Miss Scott and Mr. Campbell, during a lengthy murder trial.

The play premiered in Santa Barbara, then ran for two weeks each in San Francisco and Los Angeles, with Helen Hayes and Herbert Marshall in the lead roles. It marked Hayes' return to the stage three years after her lengthy run in Victoria Regina.

The Broadway production was produced by Gilbert Miller and co-directed by MacArthur and Lewis Allen. The scenic design was by Boris Aronson. It opened at the Martin Beck Theatre on October 17, 1939 and closed on January 13, 1940 after running for 105 performances.

The play was filmed as Perfect Strangers in 1950.

Principal Broadway cast
Helen Hayes ..... Miss Scott
Philip Merivale ..... Mr. Campbell
Pat Harrington ..... Patullo
Robert Keith ..... Reynolds
Roy Roberts ..... Ward 
Evelyn Varden ..... Mrs. Bradford

Critical reception
Of the play Time said, "[it] brings Near-Divinity Helen Hayes back to Broadway in her first new role there since December 1935. For this Broadway can rejoice, even though finding anything to rejoice at in the play itself is like looking for a needle in a Hayestack. After a two-month tryout, this thing of shreds & patches is still, like Gaul, divided into three parts — comedy, drama, romance — and, as in Gaul, the three parts are on very uncivil terms."

References

External links

1939 plays
Plays by Charles MacArthur
Broadway plays
Plays by Ben Hecht
Plays based on other plays
American plays adapted into films